Gravesend was a county constituency centred on the town of Gravesend, Kent which returned one Member of Parliament (MP)  to the House of Commons of the Parliament of the United Kingdom from 1868 until it was abolished for the 1983 general election. It is most notable for being a bellwether, with the winner of Gravesend (and its successor Gravesham) winning every election from 1918 through to the present day except for 1929, 1951, and 2005.

Boundaries 
1868–1885: The parishes of Gravesend, Milton, and Northfleet.

1918–1950: The Borough of Gravesend, the Urban District of Northfleet, and the Rural Districts of Hoo and Strood.

1950–1955: The Borough of Gravesend, the Urban Districts of Northfleet and Swanscombe, and the Rural District of Strood.

1955–1983: The Borough of Gravesend, the Urban District of Northfleet, and the Rural District of Strood.

Members of Parliament

Election results

Elections in the 1860s

Elections in the 1870s

Elections in the 1880s

The 1880 election was declared void on account of bribery, whereby Bevan had "given his men a holiday and paid them their wages".

Elections in the 1890s

Palmer resigned, causing a by-election.

Elections in the 1900s

Elections in the 1910s

General Election 1914–15:

Another General Election was required to take place before the end of 1915. The political parties had been making preparations for an election to take place and by July 1914, the following candidates had been selected; 
Unionist: Gilbert Parker
Liberal:

Elections in the 1920s 

* Davies stood for election as an 'Anti-Waste' candidate, but was not officially supported by the Anti-Waste League

Elections in the 1930s

Elections in the 1940s

Elections in the 1950s

Elections in the 1960s

Elections in the 1970s

See also 
 1947 Gravesend by-election

References

Bibliography
 
 

History of Gravesend, Kent
Parliamentary constituencies in Kent (historic)
Constituencies of the Parliament of the United Kingdom established in 1868
Constituencies of the Parliament of the United Kingdom disestablished in 1983
Gravesham